Harry Hansen may refer to:

 Harry Hansen (politician) (1919–2003), Norwegian politician
 Harry Hansen (gymnast), American Olympic gymnast
 Harry L. Hansen (1911–1992), pioneer of management education
 Harry Hansen (author) (1884–1977), American journalist, editor, literary critic and historian
 Harry Hansen (footballer)

See also 
 Harry Hanson (disambiguation)
 Henry Hansen (disambiguation)
 Harry Roeck-Hansen (1891–1959), Swedish stage and film actor